Puustinen is a Finnish surname. Notable people with the surname include:

Jami Puustinen, Finnish footballer
Juuso Puustinen, Finnish ice-hockey player
Risto Puustinen, Finnish football manager and former footballer
Timo Puustinen, Finnish film director

Finnish-language surnames